BD Phoenicis is a variable star in the constellation of Phoenix. Its absolute magnitude is calculated at 1.5.

Description
BD Phoenicis is a Lambda Boötis star, an uncommon type of peculiar stars that have very low abundances of iron-peak elements. In particular, BD Phoenicis has near-solar carbon and oxygen content, but its iron abundance is only 4% the solar value. BD Phoenicis is also a pulsating variable of Delta Scuti type, varying its apparent magnitude between 5.90 and 5.94. A study of its light curve detected seven pulsation periods that range from 50 to 84 minutes, the strongest one having a period of 57 minutes and an amplitude of 9 milli-magnitudes. Pulsations are common among Lambda Boötis star and seem to be more common than on normal main sequence stars of the same spectral type.

BD Phoenicis is an A-type main-sequence star with a spectral type of A1Va. Stellar evolution models indicate it has about double the solar mass and an age of about 800 million years, having completed 83% of its main sequence lifetime. BD Phoenicis has a composite spectra that indicates it is a binary star, but nothing is known about the companion.

Observations by the Herschel Space Observatory have detected an infrared excess from BD Phoenicis, indicating that there is a debris disk in the system. The existence of debris disks is possibly related to the Lambda Boötis phenomenon.

References

Delta Scuti variables
Lambda Boötis stars
Phoenix (constellation)
A-type main-sequence stars
Durchmusterung objects
011413
008593
0541
Phoenicix, BD